Elections for Coventry City Council were held on Thursday 1 May 2008. As the council is elected by thirds, one seat in each of the wards was up for election.

The Labour Party gained two seats (Radford, whose sitting councillor had been elected for Labour but later switched parties, and Foleshill) from the Conservative Party and the Conservatives gained one seat (Westwood) from Labour.

The Conservative Party lost overall control of the council, but remained the ruling party, with half of the seats.

Election result

Council Composition
The composition of the council before and after the election can be found in the following table:

Ward results

Note: Gains and holds of wards are noted with respect to the 2006 council election except for Radford - where the seat changed hands by defection.. Percentage changes are given with respect to the 2007 council election.

Turnout figures include spoilt ballots.

References

2008 English local elections
2008
2000s in Coventry